Gershwin: Piano Concerto in F is an album by Marcus Roberts, his trio and the Saito Kinen Orchestra under the direction of Seiji Ozawa, recorded live at the Saito Kinen Festival in 2005. It features Roberts' arrangement of Gershwin's concerto. This was Roberts' second time working with Ozawa on a live recording, A Gershwin Night being the first. The album saw a limited release in Japan.

Track listing

Concerto in F (George Gershwin)
 "Allegro" - 17:45
 "Adagio -Andante con moto" - 15:45
 "Allegro agitato" - 9:21

4. "Happy Birthday To You (Mildred Junius Welch)" - 2:19

Personnel
Marcus Roberts - piano
Roland Guerin - bass
Jason Marsalis - drums
Seiji Ozawa - conductor
Saito Kinen Orchestra

Additional personnel
Dominic Fyfe - executive producer, recording producer
Phil Siney - balance engineer, tape editor
Ryu Kawashima, Mariko Miyashita, and Chiaki Shigemoto - recording engineers
Tadaatsu Atarashi - production coordination

2006 live albums
Marcus Roberts albums
Recordings of music by George Gershwin